5th Street/Independence Hall station is a subway station in Philadelphia, Pennsylvania at the intersection of 5th and Market Street served by SEPTA's Market-Frankford Line. The station serves multiple notable Philadelphia landmarks including Independence Hall, the Liberty Bell, the National Constitution Center, the National Museum of American Jewish History, and the Philadelphia Bourse.

The station originally opened as 5th Street station and was renamed by SEPTA on June 29, 2016.

History
The station opened August 3, 1908 as part of the first extension of the Philadelphia Rapid Transit Company's Market Street Subway. The line had originally opened a year earlier between 69th Street and 15th Street station.

The station was expanded in the 1950s along with the creation of the Independence Mall, and was last rehabilitated in 1974 in preparation for the United States Bicentennial. Elevators were installed in 2010, making the station accessible under the Americans with Disabilities Act.

In July 2016, the city approved designs to rehabilitate the station, including new signage and lighting, rebuilt staircases and headhouses, as well as new artwork. The project began fall 2018 and it is scheduled for completion in fall 2020, coming in at an estimated total cost of $19.5 million. During the construction project, trains were bypassing the station.

Station layout

The station has two side platforms with separate fare control on either side. 5th Street is the only station on the line in Center City that does not have a mezzanine crossover between the two platforms.

Image gallery

References

External links

5th Street-Independence Station images (World-NYCSubway.org)
 5th Street entrance from Google Maps Street View

SEPTA Market-Frankford Line stations
Railway stations in Philadelphia
Railway stations in the United States opened in 1908
Railway stations located underground in Pennsylvania
1908 establishments in Pennsylvania